Barry McLaughlin (born 19 April 1973 in Paisley) is a Scottish football manager and former professional footballer. He played for St Mirren for ten years, and was captain of the St Mirren side in his last season. After this he went on to play for Kilmarnock and Ayr United. After leaving senior football in 2006 he joined the junior leagues to play for Irvine Meadow, before retiring completely in 2009.

McLaughlin was appointed manager of new West of Scotland League members Thorn Athletic in July 2022, having previously been in charge of the Glenvale under-20 team.

References 

1973 births
Living people
Footballers from Paisley, Renfrewshire
Scottish footballers
Association football defenders
St Mirren F.C. players
Kilmarnock F.C. players
Ayr United F.C. players
Scottish Premier League players
Scottish Football League players
Scottish football managers